In Norway, the Minister of Justice and Public Security is the head of the Royal Norwegian Ministry of Justice and the Police and a member of Government of Norway. The current minister is Emilie Enger Mehl.

Until 1 January 2012 the post was named the Minister of Justice and the Police.

List of ministers
Key

2nd Ministry (justice affairs) (1814–1818)

Ministry of Justice and the Police (1819–1945)

During the German occupation of Norway (1940–1945)

Ministry of Justice and the Police (1945–2012)

Ministry of Justice and Public Security (2012–)

Minister of Immigration and Integration
The Minister of Immigration and Integration was a minister-post that was responsible for dealing with immigration and integration related cases. The post was established in 2015 in response to the 2015 European migrant crisis, and was abolished in 2018. Sylvi Listhaug was the first and only person to hold the post, and was promoted to Minister of Justice when the position was abolished in 2018.

Key

Minister

Minister of Public Security
The Minister of Public Security was a post established in 2019 after the Christian Democrats joined the Solberg Cabinet. The post was primarily responsible for issues related to public security.

Key

Minister

See also
Courts of justice of Norway
Governor of Svalbard
Justice ministry
 National Police Directorate
Norwegian Correctional Services
Norwegian Ministry of Justice and the Police
 Norwegian Police Security Agency
Politics of Norway

References

External links
 Ministry of Justice and Public Security

Minister
Justice and the Police